Algerian Chronicles is a collection of writings by the Nobel laureate Albert Camus published in French in 1958. The book was translated into English and published as Algerian Chronicles in 2013. Albert Camus's neutrality in the Algerian Conflict is illustrated. The book also shows how both the French Right and the French Left were hostile to Camus because of this stance.

References

1958 non-fiction books
Books by Albert Camus
Algerian War